Pan 70 is a series of books published by Pan Books in the UK. The books were released on 7 September 2017 to celebrate the 70th anniversary of the publication of the first Pan paperback, Ten Stories by Rudyard Kipling. The books were released in A-format size, with the covers redesigned in classic technicolour.

The Books

See also

 Penguin Essentials

References

External links

 Official site

Lists of novels
Pan Books books